The AAF QB Draft was the only draft for the Alliance of American Football (AAF), held in advance of the 2019 season. The draft was a four-round quarterback draft where clubs were allowed to "protect or pick" from the selection. It was held on November 27, 2018, at the HyperX Esports Arena at Luxor Las Vegas and broadcast on the CBS Sports Network.

Draft rules
The draft lasted four rounds with a preset draft order. The first round included a "pick or protect" method, where if a team elected to protect a player, they selected their player before the teams electing to not protect a player from their region. The second round kept the original selection order with the third and fourth rounds being the reverse order selection.

"Protect or pick" rules
Quarterbacks were allocated by region based on where they played college football or last played with an NFL or CFL team. If the player went to school outside of an Alliance team's area, the player was unallocated and eligible for selection by any team. Teams were given the option to "protect" any player from their area, and would become that team's first round selection. Teams electing not to "protect" a player would then "pick" from the entire pool of eligible quarterbacks based on draft order for their first round selection. Any quarterback that was already signed to an Alliance team was eligible to be selected in the draft.

Player selections

References

Further reading

QB Draft
American football drafts
2018 in sports in Nevada
November 2018 sports events in the United States
21st century in Las Vegas
Events in Las Vegas
American football in Nevada